Amateur Daddy is a 1932 American pre-Code drama film directed by John G. Blystone and written by Frank Dolan and Doris Malloy. The film stars Warner Baxter, Marian Nixon, Rita La Roy, and David Landau. The film was released on April 10, 1932, by Fox Film Corporation.

Cast        
Warner Baxter as Jim Gladden
Marian Nixon as Sally Smith
Rita La Roy as Lotti Pelgram
William Pawley as 2nd Fred Smith
Lucille Powers as Olive Smith
David Landau as Sam Pelgram
Clarence Wilson as William J. 'Bill' Hansen
Frankie Darro as Pete Smith
Gail Kornfeld as Lily Smith
Joe Hachey as Sam Pelgram, Jr.
Edwin Stanley as 1st Fred Smith
Joan Breslau as Nancy Smith

References

External links 
 
 

1932 films
Fox Film films
American drama films
1932 drama films
Films directed by John G. Blystone
American black-and-white films
1930s English-language films
1930s American films